Erlena Chisolm Bland (January 18, 1923 – February 16, 2009) was an American painter and sculptor.

Born in Washington, D.C., Bland attended Dunbar High School and earned her Bachelor of Fine Arts degree from Howard University; she received a master's degree in library science at the University of Maryland, College Park. She spent nearly two decades as a librarian working with special education students at Goding Elementary School in Washington. She created art during her free time, and in retirement took classes at the Maryland Institute College of Art, the Corcoran School of Art, and the Art League in Alexandria, Virginia before acquiring a studio. She exhibited throughout the Washington D.C. area and further afield during her career, showing work both solo and in group exhibitions. With her husband, Dr. Charles N. Bland, she had two children, a son and a daughter; the couple designed and built their own home on Kalmia Road in Washington. Bland died of cancer at a nursing home in Washington. She was buried at Fort Lincoln Cemetery after a funeral at the Dumbarton Chapel on the Howard University campus.

References

1923 births
2009 deaths
American women painters
American women sculptors
Painters from Washington, D.C.
Howard University alumni
University of Maryland, College Park alumni
American librarians
American women librarians
Deaths from cancer in Washington, D.C.
African-American sculptors
Maryland Institute College of Art alumni
Corcoran School of the Arts and Design alumni
20th-century American painters
21st-century American painters
20th-century American sculptors
21st-century American sculptors
20th-century American women artists
21st-century American women artists
African-American painters